José Saizozema (born 30 November 1965) is a Dominican Republic boxer. He competed in the men's light welterweight event at the 1988 Summer Olympics. At the 1988 Summer Olympics, he lost to Ike Quartey of Ghana.

References

1965 births
Living people
Dominican Republic male boxers
Olympic boxers of the Dominican Republic
Boxers at the 1988 Summer Olympics
Place of birth missing (living people)
Light-welterweight boxers